Carcinoembryonic antigen-related cell adhesion molecule 7 is a protein that in humans is encoded by the CEACAM7 gene.

References

External links

Further reading